Tezozomoc (also Tezozómoc, Tezozomoctli, Tezozomoctzin) was a Nahuatl male name. Bearers may refer to:

Fernando Alvarado Tezozómoc, postconquest Aztec chronicler
Tezozomoc (Azcapotzalco) (died 1426), ruler of Azcapotzalco
Tezozomoc (son of Itzcoatl), father of three Aztec rulers
Tezozomoctli (Cuauhtitlan) (died 1430), ruler of Quauhtitlan
Tezozomoctli (Cuitlahuac Tizic) (1406–1483), ruler of Cuitlahuac Tizic
Tezozomoctli Acolnahuacatl, brother of Moctezuma II
Tezozomoc (son of Chimalpopoca), king of Ecatepec
Tezozómoc metro station, Mexico City
Parque Tezozómoc, Mexico City